Irina Kostyuchenkova (born 11 May 1961) is a retired female javelin thrower who represented the Soviet Union and later Ukraine.

Kostyuchenkova was born in Chelyabinsk.  She is best known for winning the gold medal in the women's javelin throw event at the 1987 Summer Universiade in Zagreb, FR Yugoslavia.

Achievements

External links
 
 

1961 births
Living people
Ukrainian female javelin throwers
Soviet female javelin throwers
Athletes (track and field) at the 1988 Summer Olympics
Athletes (track and field) at the 1992 Summer Olympics
Olympic athletes of the Soviet Union
Olympic athletes of the Unified Team
Universiade medalists in athletics (track and field)
Ukrainian people of Russian descent
Goodwill Games medalists in athletics
Universiade gold medalists for the Soviet Union
Medalists at the 1987 Summer Universiade
Competitors at the 1986 Goodwill Games